Stuart Fitzsimmons (28 December 1956 – 11 November 2019) was a British alpine skier. He competed in three events at the 1976 Winter Olympics.

References

External links
 

1956 births
2019 deaths
British male alpine skiers
Olympic alpine skiers of Great Britain
Alpine skiers at the 1976 Winter Olympics
Deaths from pneumonia in Scotland
Place of birth missing